Maraya is a Syrian television series.

Maraya may also refer to

 Maraya (building), a concert hall in Saudi Arabia
 Dan Maraya (1946–2015), a Nigerian griot

See also 
 Maraaya, a Slovenian duo of musicians